Colour Yellow Productions is an Indian motion picture production company founded by filmmaker and film producer Anand L. Rai.

History
Colour Yellow Productions was founded in 2011 by Anand L. Rai.  The company has produced successful films that include the Tanu Weds Manu franchise (2011, 2015), the Happy Bhag Jayegi franchise (2016, 2018), Raanjhanaa (2013), Nil Battey Sannata (2016), Manmarziyaan (2018), Tumbbad (2018), Zero (2018), Laal Kaptaan (2019), Shubh Mangal Zyada Saavdhan (2020) and Haseen Dillruba (2021), Atrangi Re (2022).

Upcoming projects
Colour Yellow Production is set to produce Good Luck Jerry starring Janhvi Kapoor collaborating with Lyca Productions and Raksha Bandhan starring Akshay Kumar both ventures to be directed by Rai.

Filmography

Awards

References

External links 

Film production companies based in Mumbai
Indian companies established in 2011
2011 establishments in Maharashtra
Mass media companies established in 2011